Žitoše is a village in the municipality of Dolneni, North Macedonia. It used to be a municipality of its own and its FIPS code was MKC4.

Demographics
According to the 2021 census, the village had a total of 1.690 inhabitants. Ethnic groups in the village include:

Albanians 1.280
Bosniaks 354
Turks 10
Serbs 3
Macedonians 1
Others 42

Sports
The local football club FK Bratstvo 07 plays in the Macedonian Second Football League.

References

External links

Villages in Dolneni Municipality
Albanian communities in North Macedonia